The United States Air Force's  548th Intelligence, Surveillance and Reconnaissance Group is an intelligence unit located at Beale AFB, California.

The group was first activated as the 6th Photographic Technical Squadron in November 1943.  After training in the United States, it deployed to the Southwest Pacific Theater, serving in the Pacific until VJ Day.  After the end of World War II the squadron remained in the Far East, serving in the occupation forces in Japan.  It was still in Japan as the 548th Reconnaissance Technical Squadron, when the Korean War began in June 1950.  It supported reconnaissance units in Japan until inactivated in 1960.

The squadron was activated to support Pacific Air Forces at Hickam Air Force Base in October 1965.  As the Vietnam War increased the need for photographic interpretation, it expanded to become a group two years later.  The 548th continued to serve in the Pacific until inactivating in 1992.

As the 548th Air Intelligence Group the unit was activated in August 1992, supporting Air Combat Command intelligence requirements until October 1994 when it was again inactivated.  Its most recent activation at Beale Air Force Base took place in October 2003.

Mission
The mission of the 548 ISRG is to operate and maintain a $1B AN/GSQ-272 "Sentinel" weapon system (also known as Distributed Ground Station or DGS), and provide combatant commanders with processing, exploitation, and dissemination (PED) of actionable intelligence data collected by U-2, MQ-1, MQ-9 and RQ-4 aircraft and other platforms as required.

History
The group was first activated in November 1943 as the 6th Photographic Technical Squadron.

Lineage
 Constituted as the 6th Photographic Technical Squadron on 20 November 1943
 Activated on 1 Dec 1943
 Redesignated 548 Reconnaissance Technical Squadron on 7 January 1950
 Discontinued on 8 March 1960
 Organized on 8 October 1965
 Redesignated 548th Reconnaissance Technical Group on 1 October 1967
 Inactivated on 3 July 1991
 Redesignated 548th Air Intelligence Group on 1 August 1992
 Activated on 27 August 1992
 Inactivated on 1 October 1994
 Redesignated 548th Intelligence Group on 23 October 2003
 Activated on 1 December 2003
 Redesignated 548th Intelligence, surveillance and Reconnaissance Group''' on 1 January 2009

Assignments
 III Reconnaissance Command, 1 December 1943
 Thirteenth Air Force, 13 May 1944
 91st Reconnaissance Wing, 10 November 1945
 Pacific Air Command, US Army (later Far East Air Forces), 27 January 1946
 Fifth Air Force, 5 January 1950
 Far East Air Forces, 18 February 1950
 Japanese Air Defense Force, 1 May 1952
 6007th Composite Reconnaissance Group (later 6007th Reconnaissance Group, 11 August 1954
 Far East Air Forces, 2 April 1955
 6007th Reconnaissance Group, 1 July 1955
 Fifth Air Force, 1 July 1957
 67th Tactical Reconnaissance Wing, 1 October 1957 – 8 March 1960
 Pacific Air Forces, 30 June 1965 – 3 July 1991
 Air Combat Command, 27 August 1992
 Second Air Force, 1 October 1992
 Twelfth Air Force, 1 July 1993 – 1 October 1994
 480th Intelligence Wing (later 480th Intelligence, Surveillance and Intelligence Wing), 1 December 2003 – present

Components
9th Intelligence Squadron (???-Present)
13th Intelligence Squadron (???-Present)
48th Intelligence Squadron (???-Present)

Stations
 Will Rogers Field, Oklahoma, 1 December 1943 – 11 April 1944
 Guadalcanal, Solomon Islands, 13 May - 28 November 1944
 Morotai, Philippines, 12 December 1944
 Camp Dulag, Leyte, Philippines, 30 September 1945
 Fort William McKinley, Luzon, Philippines, 22 November 1945
 Tokyo, Japan, 17 May 1946
 Yokota Army Air Base (later Yokota Air Base), Japan, September 1946
 Showa Air Station, Japan, 30 June 1958
 Yokota Air Base, Japan, 6–8 March 1960
 Hickam Air Force Base, Hawaii, 8 October 1965 – 3 December 1991
 Langley Air Force Base, Virginia, 27 August 1992 – 1 October 1994
 Beale Air Force Base, California, 1 December 2003 – present

Awards and campaigns

References

Notes

Citations

Bibliography

External links

Intelligence groups of the United States Air Force
Military units and formations in California